The National Union of the Unions of the Workers of Benin (UNSTB) was, from its founding in 1974 until the 1990s, the sole union federation in Benin. It was originally closely related to the People's Revolutionary Party of Benin (PRPB).

The UNSTB is affiliated with the International Trade Union Confederation.

See also

 Trade unions in Benin

References

Trade unions in Benin
International Trade Union Confederation
Trade unions established in 1974